Listening Point was the private retreat of conservationist Sigurd F. Olson (1899–1982) on Burntside Lake in Morse Township, Minnesota, United States.  Olson acquired the property in 1956, then purchased a log cabin and a log sauna elsewhere that he had dismantled, moved to Listening Point, and reassembled.  In 1998 the Listening Point Foundation was organized to preserve the property as an open-air museum to Olson.

In 2007 Listening Point was listed on the National Register of Historic Places for its national significance in the themes of conservation and literature.  The historic district consists of five contributing properties: the cabin, the sauna, an outhouse, a dock, and the network of trails.  The property was nominated for its association with Sigurd Olson, whose writing and advocacy had a national impact on conservation.  Olson began his work in the 1920s, opposing development of the Boundary Waters, and capped his career with the passage of the Wilderness Act in 1964.

The Listening Point Foundation offers tours and events at the site, designed to limit impacts to its historic and natural integrity.

See also
 List of museums in Minnesota
 National Register of Historic Places listings in St. Louis County, Minnesota

References

External links
 
 The Listening Point Foundation

1956 establishments in Minnesota
Buildings and structures on the National Register of Historic Places in Minnesota
Historic districts on the National Register of Historic Places in Minnesota
Literary museums in the United States
Museums in St. Louis County, Minnesota
National Register of Historic Places in St. Louis County, Minnesota
Open-air museums in Minnesota